Godewaersvelde (French Flemish: Godsvelde) is a commune in the Nord department in northern France, near the Belgian border.

Heraldry

Etymology 
The name of the commune means "Godafritha's Heath" or "Godefried Fields".

British soldiers called it "God" during the First World War. A popular story claims that Godewaersvelde means "God bless our fields", but it appears to be unfounded, and is dismissed by linguists and historians.

Another WWI troop nickname was "Gerty Wears Velvet".

 1295-1296: Gaudefroit camp
 1300: Godeverdesvelde
 1318: Godefroichamp
 1918: Goedesversvelde (in WWI news in newspapers)

Dutch: Godewaarsvelde; Frans-Vlaams: Godsvelde; official French: Godewaersvelde is in Franse Westhoek, in the Nord Department, France. The community has 2000 dwellers. In the place where French Flemish dialect and in the Westhoek becoming known as Godsvelde is spoken.

Location 
Godewaersvelde is in northern France along the Belgian border and is in the heart of Flanders, less than half an hour from Lille and Dunkirk. It is one of nine municipalities in the canton of Steenvoorde. Godewaersvelde covers 1189 hectares or nearly 12 square kilometers and is crossed by several county roads: the R & D 948 which connects at the A25 interchange in Poperinge, 139 R & D that leads to Boeschèpe and Eecke, DR 18, which connects Route Méteren to Poperinge.

See also
Communes of the Nord department
Mont des Cats

Gallery

References

Communes of Nord (French department)
Nord communes articles needing translation from French Wikipedia
French Flanders